The December 2011 Cash Converters Players Championship Finals was the fourth edition of the PDC tournament, the Players Championship Finals, which saw the top 32 players from the 2011 PDC Players Championship Order of Merit taking part. The tournament took place between 8–11 December 2011 and was held at the Doncaster Dome, Doncaster, England. This was also be the first Players Championship Final to be held before the PDC World Championship.

Phil Taylor was the defending champion, but he was defeated in the second round by Mervyn King. Kevin Painter came through the field with increasingly impressive performances to secure his first televised major title, defeating Mark Webster 13–9 in the final.

Prize money

Qualification
The top 32 players from the PDC Players Championship Order of Merit after the last Players Championship events, which was held in Wigan on 27 November, qualified for the event.

A notable absentee was world champion Adrian Lewis. Simon Whitlock withdrew from the tournament due to a broken ankle, and he was replaced by John Henderson.

Draw

Statistics

Television coverage
The tournament was broadcast in the UK on ITV4 who return to televising the tournament after the last edition was streamed through the PDC website. The tournament was also broadcast in Australia for the first time with Fox Sports showing it. In the Netherlands, the tournament was broadcast on TV (highlights) and internet (livestream) by RTL7.

References

External links
Official website
NetZone
Qualification list

Players Championship Finals
Players Championship Finals
Players Championship Finals
Players Championship Finals
Sport in Doncaster